Silvino Ruiz (1901 – death unknown), nicknamed "Poppa", was a Cuban pitcher in the Negro leagues between 1928 and 1941.

A native of Guanabacoa, Cuba, Ruiz played for the Cuban Stars (East) in 1928 and 1929, then returned to the team in 1937. He went on to play four seasons for the New York Cubans, and represented New York in the 1940 East–West All-Star Game.

References

External links
 and Baseball-Reference Black Baseball stats and Seamheads

1901 births
Date of birth missing
Year of death missing
Place of death missing
Cuban Stars (East) players
New York Cubans players
Baseball pitchers